Sugar pie is a dessert in northern French and Belgian cuisine, where it is called . It is also popular in Canada.

Various type of tarte au sucre are made. Some are a leavened dough topped with beet sugar or brown sugar, others have a crust containing a homogeneous sugar mixture which is similar to caramel after baking. The French Canadian version of the dessert sometimes uses maple syrup.

The dessert is somewhat similar to the American transparent pie (the name in the Midwestern and Southern United States for a pecan pie made without the pecans), the English Canadian butter tarts and the English treacle tart.

Notes

French cuisine
Belgian cuisine
Cuisine of Quebec
Sweet pies
French cakes